Patrick Diotte (born November 13, 1967) is a former soccer player from Canada.

Club career
Born in Longueuil, Quebec, Diotte started his professional career with the Ottawa Pioneers before moving to Montreal Supra in 1988. He spent the rest of his career at Supra and Montreal Impact.

International career
A defender, Diotte made his debut for Canada in a friendly match against the United States in March 1991. He earned a total of 5 caps, scoring no goals.

His final international game was a friendly match against Chile in October 1995.

External links
  (archive)
 

1967 births
Living people
Sportspeople from Longueuil
French Quebecers
Association football defenders
Soccer people from Quebec
Canadian soccer players
Canada men's international soccer players
1991 CONCACAF Gold Cup players
Ottawa Intrepid players
Montreal Supra players
Montreal Impact (1992–2011) players
Canadian Soccer League (1987–1992) players
American Professional Soccer League players
USISL players